SPT-100 is a Hall-effect ion thruster, part of the SPT-family of thrusters. SPT stands for Stationary Plasma Thruster. It creates a stream of electrically charged xenon ions accelerated by an electric field and confined by a magnetic field.

The thruster is manufactured by Russian OKB Fakel, and was first launched onboard Gals-1 satellite in 1994. In 2003 Fakel debuted a second generation of the thruster, called SPT-100B, and in 2011 it presented further upgrades in SPT-100M prototypes. As of 2011 SPT-100 thrusters were used in 18 Russian and 14 foreign spacecraft, including IPSTAR-II, Telstar-8 and Ekspress A and AM constellations.

Specifications

See also
 PPS-1350
 Stationary plasma thrusters（PDF)

References

Ion engines
Spacecraft propulsion